Ada Pilgrim (1867–1965) was a New Zealand healer. She was born in Paparoa, Northland, New Zealand in 1867.

References

1867 births
1965 deaths
New Zealand physiotherapists
People from the Northland Region